Mohamed Ryad Ben Haddad (born 1 April 1959) is an Algerian hurdler. He competed in the men's 110 metres hurdles at the 1984 Summer Olympics. His personal best is 14.29 seconds.

References

External links
 

1959 births
Living people
Athletes (track and field) at the 1984 Summer Olympics
Algerian male hurdlers
Olympic athletes of Algeria
Place of birth missing (living people)
21st-century Algerian people